Apple crumble is a dessert made from apples baked with a crumbled streusel topping.

Apple Crumble may also refer to:

 Apple Crumble, a 2019 album by Winston Surfshirt
 "Apple Crumble" (song), by Lime Cordiale and Idris Elba, 2021

See also
 Apple Pie (disambiguation)